The 2016–17 Cal State Fullerton Titans men's basketball team represented California State University, Fullerton during the 2016–17 NCAA Division I men's basketball season. The Titans, led by fourth year head coach Dedrique Taylor, played their home games at Titan Gym as members of the Big West Conference. They finished the season 17–15, 10–6 in Big West play to finish in third place. They defeated Cal State Northridge in the quarterfinals of the Big West tournament to advance to the Semifinals where they lost to UC Davis. They were invited to the CollegeInsider.com Tournament where they lost in the first round to Weber State.

Previous season
The Titans finished the season 10–20, 3–13 in Big West play to finish in last place. They lost in the quarterfinals of the Big West tournament to Hawaii.

Departures

Incoming transfers

2016 incoming recruits

2017 incoming recruits

Roster

Schedule and results

|-
!colspan=9 style=| Exhibition

|-
!colspan=9 style=| Non-conference regular season

|-
!colspan=9 style=| Big West regular season

|-
!colspan=9 style=| Big West tournament

|-
!colspan=9 style=| CIT

References

Cal State Fullerton Titans men's basketball seasons
Cal State Fullerton
Cal State Fullerton
Fullerton Titans
Fullerton Titans